Cougar Stadium is a baseball venue in Chicago, Illinois United States. It was home to the Chicago State Cougars baseball team of the NCAA Division I Western Athletic Conference until the baseball program was discontinued on June 23, 2020. The field hosted its first game on March 18, 2014.

History
Construction began following the 2012 season, and the venue was scheduled to be completed for the start of the 2013 season. However, construction delays pushed back the field's completion to fall 2013.

On March 18, 2014, the Cougars lost 7–1 to Valparaiso in the stadiums first-ever game.

On June 23, 2020, Chicago State University's board of trustees approved the CSU Athletics FY21 Sports Sponsorship resolution proposed by its athletic department which discontinued the baseball program effective immediately.

Features
The stadium features a press box, outdoor cages and stadium lighting.

References

External links
Cougar Stadium from Chicago State University's Athletic webpage

Baseball venues in Chicago
Defunct college baseball venues in the United States
Chicago State Cougars baseball